Gravel or Gravell is a surname. Notable people with the surname include:

Camille Gravel, 20th-century American political figure from Louisiana
John Gravel (born 1941), ice hockey player
Karl Mander Gravell, Canadian airman posthumously awarded the George Cross in 1941
Kevin Gravel, (born 1992), American ice hockey player
Mike Gravel (1930–2021), American politician; U.S. senator for Alaska
Ray Gravell, former Welsh rugby player
Raymond Gravel, Canadian political figure
Robert Gravel, 20th-century Canadian actor and theatre figure